Ram Pura is a small village in Nakodar.  Nakodar is a tehsil in the city Jalandhar of Indian state of Punjab.

STD code 
Ram Pura's STD code is 01821.

References

Villages in Jalandhar district